Duquecaxiense Futebol Clube, commonly known as Duquecaxiense, is a Brazilian football club based in Duque de Caxias, Rio de Janeiro state. The club was formerly known as Associação Atlética Duquecaxiense.

History
The club was founded on January 2, 1997, as Associação Atlética Duquecaxiense. The club won the Copa do Interior in 1997, after beating Rodoviário Piraí in the final.

Achievements

 Copa Rio:
 Winners (1): 1997

Stadium
Duquecaxiense Futebol Clube play their home games at Estádio Mestre Telê Santana, commonly known as Estádio Municipal de Duque de Caxias and Estádio Maracanazinho de Duque de Caxias. The stadium has a maximum capacity of 1,000 people.

References

Association football clubs established in 1997
Football clubs in Rio de Janeiro (state)
1997 establishments in Brazil